If You Can't Live Without Me, Why Aren't You Dead Yet? may refer to:

 A 1986 book by Cynthia Heimel
 A 1998 single by My Life Story
 A 2009 song from the album Anywhere but Here by Mayday Parade